The Good Times Bonspiel (previously known as Good Times Bonspiel) is an annual bonspiel, or curling tournament, held at the Calgary Curling Club in Calgary, Alberta. The tournament is held in a double knockout format. The tournament started in 2013 as part of the World Curling Tour's regional developmental series of events. After the 2014–15 season, the event was discontinued until it returned for the 2019–20 season under the new name, The Good Times Bonspiel.

Past champions

Men

Women

References

External links
Calgary Curling Club Home

World Curling Tour events
Curling competitions in Calgary
Women's World Curling Tour events
2013 establishments in Alberta